Jimmy Obleda (born July 21, 1972) is an American head coach of USL League One soccer club Chattanooga Red Wolves, who was placed on a provisional suspension pending the results of an investigation into allegations of misconduct.

Playing career
Obleda signed his first professional contract with Danubio at the age of 17. His professional career continued for eight years, where he played for Cerro, Liverpool Montevideo, Irapuato, Ponnistus and back in the United States with Fort Lauderdale Strikers. He was also invited to the MLS Combine in 1995.

Managerial career
Obleda spent almost 12 years coaching Super Y League team Fullerton Rangers in California. In 2011, he was named NSCAA Youth National Coach of the Year.

He spent three months of 2016 with NPSL side Deportivo Coras USA, before becoming head coach at Santiago Canyon College alongside been Director of Coaching at Boca Orange County.

On November 21, 2019, Obleda was named head coach of USL League One side Chattanooga Red Wolves. 

On July 22, 2022, Obleda was placed on a provisional suspension pending the results of an investigation into allegations of misconduct brought forth by the USL Players Association. The United Soccer League Players Association lost confidence in the Chattanooga Red Wolves handling of the investigation, and filed a report with the U.S. Center for SafeSport asking them to investigate.

References

Living people
1972 births
American soccer coaches
American soccer players
USL League One coaches
Soccer players from California
Danubio F.C. players
C.A. Cerro players
Liverpool F.C. (Montevideo) players
Irapuato F.C. footballers
Fort Lauderdale Strikers (1988–1994) players
National Premier Soccer League coaches
College men's soccer coaches in the United States
American expatriate soccer players
Expatriate footballers in Uruguay
Expatriate footballers in Mexico
Expatriate footballers in Finland
American expatriate sportspeople in Uruguay
American expatriate sportspeople in Mexico
American expatriate sportspeople in Finland
Association footballers not categorized by position